Kerrigan is a surname of Irish origin. Anglicized from the Gaelic "Ó Ciaragán." From the word ciar, it means "black; dark."

People
Notable people with the surname include:
 Dan Kerrigan (1843–1880), American pugilist, sportsman, and politician
 Danny Kerrigan (born 1982), English footballer
 Daryl Kerrigan, Irish-American fashion designer
 Don Kerrigan (1941–1990), Scottish football player
 Frank Kerrigan (1868–1935), United States District Judge
 Gene Kerrigan, Irish journalist and novelist
 Herbert Kerrigan (1879–1959), American track and field athlete
 James Kerrigan (1828–1899), United States Representative from New York
 J. M. Kerrigan (James Michael Kerrigan, 1884–1964), Irish actor
 Jimmy Kerrigan (born 1959), Irish Gaelic football player
 Joe Kerrigan (born 1954), American baseball player
 John Kerrigan (disambiguation), several people
 Jonathan Kerrigan (born 1972), English actor
 Justin Kerrigan (born 1974), Welsh writer and film director
 Kait Kerrigan, American playwright, musical theater lyricist and book writer
 Kathleen Kerrigan (actress) (c.1869–1957), American actress
 Kathleen Kerrigan (judge), American federal judge
 Lodge Kerrigan (born 1964), American motion picture screenwriter and director
 Marguerite Kerrigan (born 1931), American professional baseball player
 Michael Kerrigan (1952–2014), British television director
 Mike Kerrigan (born 1960), American football player
 Nancy Kerrigan (born 1969), American figure skater
 Patrick J. Kerrigan (1864–1895), New York assemblyman 
 Patrick Kerrigan (1928–1979), Irish politician
 Paul Kerrigan (born 1986), Irish Gaelic footballer
 Peter Kerrigan (1899–1977), British trade unionist
 Rose Kerrigan (1903–1995), British communist
 Ryan Kerrigan (born 1988), American football player
 Simon Kerrigan (born 1989), English cricketer
 Steve Kerrigan (born 1971), American politician
 Steve Kerrigan (footballer) (born 1972), Scottish football player
 T. S. Kerrigan (Thomas Sherman Kerrigan, born 1939), American lawyer and poet
 Tom Kerrigan (golfer) (1895–1964), American golfer
 Tom Kerrigan (American football) (1906–1979), American football player
 J. Warren Kerrigan (1879–1947), American silent film actor and film director

Fictional characters
 Sarah Kerrigan, fictional character in the StarCraft universe and Heroes of the Storm
 Ryan Kerrigan, fictional character fiancé of Amelia Shepherd in the Grey's Anatomy universe

Surnames of Irish origin

References